The 71st New York State Legislature, consisting of the New York State Senate and the New York State Assembly, met from January 4 to April 12, 1848, during the second year of John Young's governorship, in Albany.

Background
Under the provisions of the New York Constitution of 1846, 32 Senators were elected in single-seat senatorial districts for a two-year term, the whole Senate being renewed biennially. The senatorial districts (except those in New York City) were made up of entire counties. 128 Assemblymen were elected in single-seat districts to a one-year term, the whole Assembly being renewed annually. The Assembly districts were made up of entire towns, or city wards, forming a contiguous area, all in the same county. The City and County of New York was divided into four senatorial districts, and 16 Assembly districts.

On September 27, the Legislative passed "An Act to provide for the election of a Lieutenant Governor", to fill the vacancy caused by the resignation of Addison Gardiner.

At this time there were two major political parties: the Democratic Party and the Whig Party. The Democratic Party was split into two factions: the "Barnburners" and the "Hunkers." The radical abolitionists appeared as the Liberty Party. The Anti-Rent Party nominated some candidates, but mostly cross-endorsed Whigs or Democrats, according to their opinion on the rent issue. The Native American Party (later better known as "Know Nothings") also ran.

Elections
The New York state election, 1847 was held on November 3. Hamilton Fish (W) was elected Lieutenant Governor; and all the other eleven statewide elective offices were won by the Whigs.

24 Whigs and 8 Democrats were elected to the State Senate. 93 Whigs and 35 Democrats were elected to the Assembly.

Sessions
The Legislature met for the regular session at the Old State Capitol in Albany on January 4, 1848; and adjourned on April 12.

Amos K. Hadley (W) was elected Speaker with 89 votes against 22 for Henry Wager (D).

State Senate

Districts

 1st District: Queens, Richmond and Suffolk counties
 2nd District: Kings County
 3rd District: 1st, 2nd, 3rd, 4th, 5th and 6th wards of New York City
 4th District: 7th, 10th, 13th and 17th wards of New York City
 5th District: 8th, 9th and 14th wards of New York City
 6th District: 11th, 12th, 15th, 16th, 18th, 19th, 20th, 21st and 22nd wards of New York City
 7th District: Putnam,  Rockland and Westchester counties
 8th District: Columbia and Dutchess counties
 9th District: Orange and Sullivan counties
 10th District: Greene and Ulster counties
 11th District: Albany and Schenectady counties
 12th District: Rensselaer County
 13th District: Saratoga and Washington counties
 14th District: Clinton, Essex and Warren counties
 15th District: Franklin and St. Lawrence counties
 16th District: Fulton, Hamilton, Herkimer and Montgomery counties
 17th District: Delaware and Schoharie counties
 18th District: Chenango and Otsego counties
 19th District: Oneida County
 20th District: Madison and Oswego counties
 21st District: Jefferson and Lewis counties
 22nd District: Onondaga County
 23rd District: Broome, Cortland and Tioga counties
 24th District: Cayuga and Wayne counties
 25th District: Seneca, Tompkins and Yates counties
 26th District: Chemung and Steuben counties
 27th District: Monroe County
 28th District: Genesee, Niagara and Orleans counties
 29th District: Livingston and Ontario counties
 30th District: Allegany and Wyoming counties
 31st District: Erie County
 32nd District: Cattaraugus and Chautauqua counties

Note: There are now 62 counties in the State of New York. The counties which are not mentioned in this list had not yet been established, or sufficiently organized, the area being included in one or more of the abovementioned counties.

Members
The asterisk (*) denotes members of the previous Legislature who continued in office as members of this Legislature. Valentine Treadwell and William J. Cornwell changed from the Assembly to the Senate.

Party affiliations follow the vote on Clerk and Sergeant-at-Arms.

Employees
 Clerk: Andrew H. Calhoun
 Deputy Clerks: John P. Lott, J. N. T. Tucker
 Sergeant-at-Arms: Senter M. Giddings
 Doorkeeper: Ransom Van Valkenburgh
 Assistant Doorkeeper: George A. Loomis
 Reporter (Albany Argus): William G. Bishop
 Reporter (Evening Journal): Frans. S. Rew
 Messengers: John Manning, Richard E. Nagle
 Janitor: David Emery

State Assembly

Assemblymen
The asterisk (*) denotes members of the previous Legislature who continued as members of this Legislature.

Party affiliations follow the vote on Speaker.

Employees
 Clerk: Philander B. Prindle
 Deputy Clerks: Edgar A. Barber, William E. Mills, Friend W. Humphrey
 Sergeant-at-Arms: Samuel H. Marks
 Assistant Sergeant-at-Arms: William Van Olinda
 Doorkeeper: John Davies
 First Assistant Doorkeeper: Samuel Merclean
 Second Assistant Doorkeeper: Erasmus D. S. Strong
 Doorkeeper for the Gentlemen's Gallery: Isaac Betticker
 Dorrkeeper for the Ladies' Gallery: Alexander Hamilton Stoutenburgh
 Porter: George Fonda
 Librarians: Ira Dubois, John T. Diossey
 Messengers: William Freeman, George W. Weed, Peter Craff, Edward Martin, James Whelpley, Seymour Daley, Harris Fellows, Peter Drum, Andrew Ryan, Penfield Strong, Webster Gardiner, Eugene Rearden, A. W. Baker

Notes

Sources
 The New York Civil List compiled by Franklin Benjamin Hough (Weed, Parsons and Co., 1858) [pg. 109 for Senate districts; pg. 136 for senators; pg. 148–157 for Assembly districts; pg. 234ff for assemblymen]
 Documents of the Senate (71st Session) (1848; pg. 61ff

071
1848 in New York (state)
1848 U.S. legislative sessions